Welsh rarebit or Welsh rabbit ( or ) is a dish consisting of a hot cheese-based sauce served over slices of toasted bread. The original 18th-century name of the dish was the jocular "Welsh rabbit", which was later reinterpreted as "rarebit", as the dish contains no rabbit. Variants include English rabbit, Scottish rabbit, buck rabbit, golden buck, and blushing bunny.

Though there is no strong evidence that the dish originated in Welsh cuisine, it is sometimes identified with the Welsh caws pobi 'baked cheese', documented in the 1500s.

Sauce
Some recipes simply melt grated cheese on toast, making it identical to cheese on toast. Others make the sauce of cheese, ale, and mustard, and garnished with cayenne pepper or paprika. Other recipes add wine or Worcestershire sauce. The sauce may also blend cheese and mustard into a béchamel sauce.

Variants
Hannah Glasse, in her 1747 cookbook The Art of Cookery, gives close variants "Scotch rabbit", "Welsh rabbit" and two versions of "English rabbit".

To make a Scotch rabbit, toast a piece of bread very nicely on both sides, butter it, cut a slice of cheese about as big as the bread, toast it on both sides, and lay it on the bread.

To make a Welsh rabbit, toast the bread on both sides, then toast the cheese on one side, lay it on the toast, and with a hot iron brown the other side. You may rub it over with mustard.

To make an English rabbit, toast a slice of bread brown on both sides, lay it in a plate before the fire, pour a glass of red wine over it, and let it soak the wine up; then cut some cheese very thin and lay it very thick over the bread, and put it in a tin oven before the fire, and it will be toasted and browned presently. Serve it away hot.

Or do it thus. Toast the bread and soak it in the wine, set it before the fire, cut your cheese in very thin slices, rub butter over the bottom of a plate, lay the cheese on, pour in two or three spoonfuls of white wine, cover it with another plate, set it over a chafing-dish of hot coals for two or three minutes, then stir it till it is done and well mixed. You may stir in a little mustard; when it is enough lay it on the bread, just brown it with a hot shovel.

Served with an egg on top, it makes a buck rabbit or a golden buck.

Welsh rarebit blended with tomato (or tomato soup) makes a blushing bunny.

In France,  is popular in the Nord-Pas-de-Calais and Côte d'Opale regions.

Name
The first recorded reference to the dish was "Welsh rabbit" in 1725 in an English context, but the origin of the term is unknown. It was probably intended to be jocular.

Welsh
"Welsh" was probably used as a pejorative dysphemism, meaning "anything substandard or vulgar", and suggesting that "only people as poor and stupid as the Welsh would eat cheese and call it rabbit", or that "the closest thing to rabbit the Welsh could afford was melted cheese on toast". Or it may simply allude to the "frugal diet of the upland Welsh". Other examples of such jocular food names are Welsh caviar (laverbread); Essex lion (calf); Norfolk capon (kipper); Irish apricot (potato); Rocky Mountain oysters (bull testicles); and Scotch woodcock (scrambled eggs and anchovies on toast).

The dish may have been attributed to the Welsh because they were fond of roasted cheese: "I am a Welshman, I do love cause boby, good roasted cheese." (1542) "Cause boby" is Welsh  'baked cheese', but it is unclear whether this is related to Welsh rabbit.

Rabbit and rarebit
The word rarebit is a corruption of rabbit, "Welsh rabbit" being first recorded in 1725, and "rarebit" in 1781. Rarebit is not used on its own, except in alluding to the dish. In 1785, Francis Grose defined a "Welch rabbit" [sic] as "a Welch rare bit", without saying which came first. Later writers were more explicit: for example, Schele de Vere in 1866 clearly considers "rabbit" to be a corruption of "rarebit".

Many commentators have mocked the misconstrual of the jocular "rabbit" as the serious "rarebit":
 Brander Matthews (1892): "few [writers] are as ignorant and dense as the unknown unfortunate who first tortured the obviously jocular Welsh rabbit into a pedantic and impossible Welsh rarebit..."
 Sivert N. Hagen (1904): "Welsh rabbit... is of jocular origin... Where, however, the word is used by the sophisticated, it is often 'corrected' to Welsh rarebit, as if 'rare bit
 Ambrose Bierce (1911): " n. A Welsh rabbit, in the speech of the humorless, who point out that it is not a rabbit. To whom it may be solemnly explained that the comestible known as toad in the hole is really not a toad, and that ris de veau à la financière is not the smile of a calf prepared after the recipe of a she banker."
 H.W. Fowler (1926): "Welsh Rabbit is amusing and right. Welsh Rarebit is stupid and wrong."

Welsh rabbit has become a standard savoury listed by culinary authorities including Auguste Escoffier, Louis Saulnier and others; they tend to use rarebit, communicating to a non-English audience that it is not a meat dish.

"Eighteenth-century English cookbooks reveal that it was then considered to be a luscious supper or tavern dish, based on the fine cheddar-type cheeses and the wheat bread [...]. Surprisingly, it seems there was not only a Welsh Rabbit, but also an English Rabbit, an Irish and a Scotch Rabbit, but nary a rarebit."

Extended use

Since the 20th century, "rarebit", "rarebit sauce", or even "rabbit sauce" has occasionally been a cheese sauce used on hamburgers or other dishes.

In culture

The notion that toasted cheese was a favourite dish irresistible to the Welsh has existed since the Middle Ages. In A C Merie Talys (100 Merry Tales), a printed book of jokes of 1526 AD (of which William Shakespeare made some use), it is told that God became weary of all the Welshmen in Heaven, 'which with their krakynge and babelynge trobelyd all the others', and asked the Porter of Heaven Gate, St Peter, to do something about it. So St Peter went outside the gates and called in a loud voice, 'Cause bobe, yt is as moche to say as rostyd chese', at which all the Welshmen ran out, and when St Peter saw they were all outside, he went in and locked the gates, which is why there are no Welshmen in heaven. The 1526 compiler says he found this story 'Wryten amonge olde gestys'.

Betty Crocker's Cookbook claims that Welsh peasants were not allowed to eat rabbits caught in hunts on the estates of the nobility, so they used melted cheese as a substitute. It also claims that Ben Jonson and Charles Dickens ate Welsh rarebit at Ye Olde Cheshire Cheese, a pub in London. It gives no evidence for any of this; indeed, Ben Jonson died almost a century before the term Welsh rabbit is first attested.

Welsh rarebit supposedly causes vivid dreams. The 1902 book Welsh Rarebit Tales is a collection of short horror stories supposedly from members of a writing club who ate a dinner which included a large portion of rarebit immediately before sleeping in order to give themselves inspiring dreams. Winsor McCay's comic strip series Dream of the Rarebit Fiend recounts the fantastic dreams that various characters have because they ate a Welsh rarebit before going to bed. In "Gomer, the Welsh Rarebit Fiend", Season 3 Episode 24 of Gomer Pyle, U.S.M.C., indulging in Welsh rarebit causes Gomer (and later Sgt. Carter) to sleepwalk and exhibit inverse personality traits.

A humorous appendix of anonymous authorship is sometimes added to the end of Thomas Browne's Pseudodoxia Epidemica, debating the existence and nature of the 'Welsh Rabbit' as though it were a real animal

See also

 Cheese roll
 Croque-monsieur and croque-madame
 Hot Brown
 Khachapuri
 Mollete
 Grilled cheese sandwich
 Horseshoe sandwich
 Monte Cristo sandwich
 Quesadilla

References

British cuisine
Cheese dishes
Toast dishes
Welsh cuisine